Fourth dimension may refer to:

Science
 Time in physics, the continued progress of existence and events
 Four-dimensional space, the concept of a fourth spatial dimension
 Spacetime, the unification of time and space as a four-dimensional continuum
 Minkowski space, the mathematical setting for special relativity

Arts and media
 Fourth dimension in art

Film
 The Fourth Dimension, a 1988 experimental film by Zbigniew Rybczyński
 The 4th Dimension (film), a 2008 film
 The Fourth Dimension (film), a 2012 film made up of three segments, each with a different director

Literature
 Fourth dimension in literature
 The Fourth Dimension (book), a 1984 non-fiction book by Rudy Rucker
 The Fourth Dimension, a book by David Yonggi Cho

Music
 The Fourth Dimension (Hypocrisy album), 1994
 The Fourth Dimension (Jack McDuff album), 1974
 Fourth Dimension (Stratovarius album), 1995
 Fourth Dimension (Radiophonic album), by Paddy Kingsland
 Fourth Dimension Records, a UK record label
 "The 4th Dimension", a song by Devo on their album Shout
 "Fourth Dimension", a song by Lights on her album Siberia
 4th Dimension, a jazz fusion quartet founded in 2007 by John McLaughlin
 "4th Dimension" (song), a song by Kids See Ghosts on their 2018 album Kids See Ghosts

Computing
 The Fourth Dimension (company), a publisher of computer games
 4th Dimension (software), a relational database management system

Other
 Four-dimensionalism, a philosophical view
 4th Dimension roller coaster, a type of roller coaster

See also
 4D (disambiguation)
 Four Dimensions (disambiguation)